Area code 710 is a special area code in the North American Numbering Plan (NANP). It was reserved for the federal government of the United States in 1983 for emergency services. Since 1994, the area code has provided access for authorized personnel to the Government Emergency Telecommunications Service (GETS) in the United States, and the Canadian local exchange carriers, and cellular/PCS networks. Previously, it was an area code in the AT&T Teletypewriter Exchange (TWX) for the northeastern part of the United States.

History
As of December 2006, it had only one working telephone number, 710-627-4387 (710-NCS-GETS) for the Government Emergency Telecommunications Service (GETS) in the National Communications System (NCS).

Teletypewriter Exchange
Area code 710 was one of three US area codes in the former AT&T Teletypewriter Exchange (TWX) network, sold to Western Union in 1969 and renamed as Telex II. It covered the US Northeast (New England, New York, New Jersey, Pennsylvania, Maryland, the District of Columbia, Virginia, and West Virginia).

The original TWX area codes were 510 in the United States and 610 in Canada. The addition of 710 in the Northeast, 810 in the South (plus Michigan, Ohio, Indiana, and Kentucky) and 910 west of the Mississippi allowed each major city one or more local exchange prefixes in the special area code.

The U.S. TWX area codes (510, 710, 810, 910) were decommissioned in 1981.  Canada moved its remaining 1 (610) numbers to area code 600 in 1992.

Current usage
The area code is reserved for use by the United States Government.  It is used in the Government Emergency Telecommunications Service (GETS), is intended for emergencies or crisis situations when the landline network is congested and the probability of completing a normal call is reduced. It provides alternate carrier routing, high probability of completion, trunk queuing and exemptions from network management controls.

A special access code of 12 digits is required for using the service.  Upon dialing this phone number, a mechanical beep prompts the caller to enter the access code. If a correct code is entered, the caller is prompted to dial the destination number (area code + number). If an access code is not entered at the beep, the call is redirected to a human operator who asks for the access code.

See also
 List of NANP area codes

References

Disaster preparedness in the United States
710